The second Hatta Cabinet was Indonesia's ninth cabinet. It was formed after the Indonesian leadership, which had been imprisoned by Dutch forces, returned to the capital, Yogyakarta. It served from 4 August to 14 December 1949.

Composition

Cabinet Leadership
Prime Minister: Mohammad Hatta
Deputy Prime Minister:  Sjafroedin Prawirnegara  (Masyumi Party)

Departmental Ministers
 State Coordinating Minister for Domestic Security: Sultan Hamengkubuwana IX
Minister of Foreign Affairs: Agus Salim  
Minister of Home Affairs: Wongsonegoro (PIR)
Minister of Justice: Soesanto Tirtoprodjo (PNI)
Minister of Finance: Lukman Hakim (Indonesian National Party – PNI)
Minister of Welfare: Ignatius J. Kasimo (PKRI)
Minister of Supply of People's  Provisions: Ignatius J. Kasimo (PKRI)
Minister of Education & Culture: S. Mangunsarkoro (PNI)
Minister of Health ad interim: Dr. Surono
Minister of Public Works: Herling Laoh (PNI)
Minister of Transportation: Herling Laoh (PNI)
Minister of Religious Affairs: Masjkur (Masyumi)
Minister of Labor and Social Affairs: Koesnan (PGRI)
Minister of Information: Samsudin (Masyumi)

State Ministers (without portfolio)
State Minister: Dr. Soekiman Wirjosandjojo (Masyumi)
State Minister: Djuanda Kartawidjaja
State Minister: Dr. Johannes Leimena (Parkindo)

Changes
Due to Hatta's departure for the Dutch-Indonesian Round Table Conference, from 6 August 1949, via Presidential Decision No. 10/A/1949, Defense Minister Sultan Hamengkubuwana IX became acting Prime Minister. He also became acting Foreign Minister while Agus Salim was unable to perform his duties from 21 October. Effective from 1 December, Dr. Johannes Leimena replaced Minister of Health ad interim Dr. Surono, leaving only two state ministers.

The end of the cabinet
The cabinet was dissolved after a fundamental change in Indonesia's political system with the establishment of the United States of Indonesia, a result of the Round Table Conference. With the coming into force of the Federal Constitution on 14 December, the cabinet was automatically dissolved and replaced by the Republic of the United States of Indonesia Cabinet, also led by Hatta.

References

Notes

Cabinets of Indonesia
Indonesian National Revolution
1949 establishments in Indonesia
1949 disestablishments in Indonesia
Cabinets established in 1949
Cabinets disestablished in 1949